Secundino Delgado Rodríguez was a Canarian politician, considered by some to be the father of Canarian nationalism.

References

Bibliography 

 
  
 
 
 
 

 
 

Canarian nationalism
Politicians from the Canary Islands
Spanish anarchists
History of the Canary Islands
1867 births
1912 deaths